The Bromberg district was a Prussian district that existed from 1772 to 1807 and then from 1815 to 1920. It initially belonged to the Netze District and from 1815 it was part of Regierungsbezirk Bromberg in the Grand Duchy of Posen and from 1848, the Prussian Province of Posen. The city of Bromberg (now Bydgoszcz, Poland) was detached from the district and formed its own urban district since 1875. Today, the territory of the district is part of the Kuyavian-Pomeranian Voivodeship in Poland.

History 
Since the First Partition of Poland in 1772, the Bromberg district was one of the four districts of the Prussian Netze District. During the Napoleonic Wars, the Bromberg district was ceded by Prussia to the Duchy of Warsaw through the Treaty of Tilsit in 1807.

The entire Netze District was restored to the Kingdom of Prussia at the Congress of Vienna on 15 May 1815. Its southeastern part with the Bromberg district was assigned to Regierungsbezirk Bromberg in the Grand Duchy of Posen which became the Province of Posen in 1848. As part of a first district reform on 1 July 1816, the Bromberg district ceded the city of Exin to the Wirsitz district. In a second district reform on 1 January 1818, the Bromberg district was significantly reduced in size. The towns of Mrotschen, Nakel and their surroundings were transferred to the Wirsitz district, and the towns of Bartschin, Labischin, Rynarschewo and Schubin, together with their surroundings formed the new district of Schubin. Another part of the Bromberg district became part of the district of Inowrazlaw. Since then, the district of Bromberg included Bromberg, Fordon, Polnisch Krone and Schulitz. The district office was set up in Bromberg.

As part of the Province of Posen, the district of Bromberg became part of the newly founded German Empire on 18 January 1871. On 29 May 1875 the city of Bromberg was detached from the Bromberg district and formed its own urban district (Stadtkreis Bromberg). The remainder of the district came to be known as Landkreis Bromberg.

On 27 December 1918 the Greater Poland uprising began in the province of Posen, but the district of Bromberg remained under German control. On 16 February 1919 an armistice ended the Polish-German fighting, and on 28 June 1919 the German government had to cede the district of Bromberg and the predominantly German-populated city of Bromberg to Poland as part of the provisions of the Treaty of Versailles. On 25 November 1919 Germany and Poland concluded an agreement on the evacuation of state facilities and the transfer of the areas to be ceded, which was ratified on 10 January 1920. The state facilities were evacuated and handed over to Poland between 17 January and 4 February 1920. The city of Bromberg, known in Polish as Bydgoszcz was handed over to Poland on 19 January 1920.

Interwar Period 
The district of Bromberg continued in Poland as Powiat Bydgoski (Bydgoszcz County). In 1920, 16 small villages were transferred from the Powiat to the city of Bydgoszcz. On 1 April 1938 the Bydgoszcz county moved from the Poznań Voivodeship to the Pomeranian Voivodeship. In 1921, Bydgoszcz county had 140,263 inhabitants, of which 14% were Germans and 86% were Poles. The city of Bydgoszcz itself had 87,643 inhabitants, of which 27% were Germans and 73% were Poles. In 1931, only 10% of the city's population were Germans.

Bromberg district in Occupied Poland (1939-1945) 
After the German Invasion of Poland in 1939, the area of the Bromberg district was annexed by Nazi Germany into Reichsgau Danzig-West Prussia and the Bromberg district was re-established. At the beginning of World War II, there were clashes between the German minority and Polish armed forces in the area, and several hundred people were killed on Bloody Sunday. After the invasion of the Wehrmacht, members of the German minority formed paramilitary units, called the Volksdeutscher Selbstschutz, led by the SS and Gestapo, and committed mass murder of the Polish population. According to Polish sources, around 5,000 Poles were killed at Fordon, and a total of 37,000 Polish residents of the city of Bydgoszcz lost their lives by the end of the war.

In 1941, the district of Bromberg had 54,949 inhabitants, the city of Bromberg itself had 144,252 inhabitants. On 1 January 1945 the district comprised three cities and 114 municipalities. At the end of World War II, numerous German residents fled west. In January 1945 the district was occupied by the Red Army and was restored to Poland.

Demographics 
According to the Prussian census of 1860, the district of Bromberg (which then also included the city of Bromberg) had a population of 71,246, of which 48,207 (67.7%) were Germans and 23,039 (32.3%) were Poles. The city of Bromberg (Stadtkreis Bromberg) was over 80% German, while Landkreis Bromberg had a German majority of around 61% in 1910. With the transfer of the district to Poland in 1920, most of the German population emigrated, due to which the district and the city had a Polish majority by 1921.

Geographical features

Communities 
The data in the tables below was extracted from the 1905 Prussian gazetteer Gemeindelexikon für das Königreich Preußen.

Stadtkreis Bromberg

Landkreis Bromberg

Hamlets that belonged to other towns or villages. (Notes indicate if residents belonged to parish different from the village that owned it).

Military command 
Kreis Bromberg was part of:

the 14th Infanterie regiment (3rd Pommersches) of the ??. Inf. Brigade. Created 1 July 1813. Honorary name of "Graf Schwerin".
the 129th Infanterie regiment (??) of the 7. Inf. Brigade. Created 24 March 1881, in Graudenz.
the 3rd Grenadier zu Pferde (cavlery) regiment (Neumärkisches) of the 4. Kav. Brigade. Created 29 December 1704. Honorary name of "Freiherr von Derfflinger".
the 15th Fußartillerie regiment (2. Pommersches) of the ?. FußA. Brigade. Created 11 August 1893. 
the 17th Fußartillerie regiment (2. Pommersches) of the 2. FußA. Brigade. Created 24 October 1872. 
 (also at Hohensalza) the 53rd Fußartillerie regiment (Hinterpommersches) of the ?. FußA. Brigade. Created 25 March 1899.

The data in the tables below was extracted from the 1905 Prussian gazetteer Gemeindelexikon für das Königreich Preußen.

Court system 
The main court (German: Landgericht) was in Bromberg, with smaller courts (German: Amtsgericht) in Bromberg and Krone.

Standesämter 
"Standesamt" is the German name of the local civil registration offices which were established in October 1874 soon after the German Empire was formed. Births, marriages and deaths were recorded. Previously, only the church records were used for Christians. In 1905, these Standesämter served towns in Kreis Bromberg:

Police districts 
In 1905, these police districts (German: Polizeidistrikt) served towns in Kreis Bromberg:

Catholic churches 
In 1905, these Catholic parish churches served towns in Kreis Bromberg:

Protestant churches 
In 1905, these Protestant parish churches served towns in Kreis Bromberg:

Officials

See also 
Bydgoszcz (general article about the modern city)

References

External links 
 List of church and government vital statistic records for Kreis Bromberg: Stadtkreis / Landkreis

Grand Duchy of Posen
Districts of the Province of Posen
Reichsgau Danzig-West Prussia
History of Bydgoszcz
Districts of West Prussia